Grand Poobah is a satirical term derived from the name of the haughty character Pooh-Bah in Gilbert and Sullivan's The Mikado (1885). In this comic opera, Pooh-Bah holds numerous exalted offices, including "First Lord of the Treasury, Lord Chief Justice, Commander-in-Chief, Lord High Admiral ... Archbishop ... Lord Mayor" and "Lord High Everything Else". The name has come to be used as a mocking title for someone self-important or locally high-ranking and who either exhibits an inflated self-regard or who has limited authority while taking impressive titles. The American writer William Safire wrote that "everyone assumes [the name] Pooh-Bah merely comes from [W. S. Gilbert] combining the two negative exclamations Pooh! plus Bah!, typical put-downs from a typical bureaucrat."

In popular culture
 The term "Grand Poobah" was used recurringly on the television show The Flintstones as the name of a high-ranking elected position in a secret society, the Loyal Order of Water Buffaloes. The main characters, Fred Flintstone and Barney Rubble, were members of the lodge. The lodge is a spoof of secret societies and men's clubs like the Freemasons, the Shriners, the Elks Club and the Moose Lodge.
 The character Howard Cunningham on the TV series Happy Days was a Grand Poobah of Leopard Lodge No. 462 in Milwaukee.

See also
 Dual mandate

References

Sources
 

Fictional titles and ranks
Gilbert and Sullivan
The Flintstones